Everybody Loves Alice is a Swedish drama film which was released to cinemas in Sweden on 4 October 2002.

Plot
Alice lives in a house with her brother, Pontus and parents, Johan and Lotta. It is revealed that Lotta doesn't love Johan and has also been having an affair. He later moves and lives with his "new" lover, Anna, who has a son called Patrik, a classmate of Alice.

The film includes Alice's problems dealing with Anna and her feelings of isolation.

Cast
Natalie Björk as Alice
Bisse Unger as Pontus
Marie Richardson as Lotta
Mikael Persbrandt as Johan
Marie Göranzon as Sonya, Lotta's mother
Sverre Anker Ousdal as Henry, Lotta's father
Hege Schøyen as Tina
Anastasios Soulis as Patrik
Lena Endre as Anna, Patrik's mother
Per Svensson as Erik, teacher
Mathilda Lundholm as Hanna
Li Lundholm as Moa
Marcus Ardai-Blomberg as Anton
Pernilla August as the psychologist's voice

References

External links
 
 
 Alla älskar Alice on Filmpunkten's website

Swedish drama films
2002 films
2002 drama films
Films directed by Richard Hobert
2000s Swedish films